Eugene Goodlow (born December 19, 1958) is a former American football wide receiver who played four seasons in the National Football League (NFL). In 1981 and 1982 he played for the Winnipeg Blue Bombers of the Canadian Football League (CFL), where he led the league in receptions and was an All-Star in 1981.  Goodlow became the first player in CFL history to reach 100 receptions in a season during the 1981 season.  In 1982, he signed a seven year, $1.6 million contract with the New Orleans Saints.  He then joined the San Diego Chargers in 1987.

References

1958 births
Living people
American football wide receivers
Kansas State Wildcats football players
American players of Canadian football
Canadian football wide receivers
Winnipeg Blue Bombers players
New Orleans Saints players
Players of American football from St. Louis
Players of Canadian football from St. Louis